Okta Logue are a  four-piece rock band based in Griesheim, Hessen Germany. The members consist of Benno Herz (bassist/vocalist), his brother Robert Herz (drums), Philip Meloi (lead guitarist), and Max Schneider (organ, synthesizers). Their style is often referred to as being influenced by '60s psychedelic rock bands mixed with modern indie rock elements.

Biography

Okta Logue first formed in the winter of 2007, as Zaphire Oktalogue. Benno Herz and Philip Meloi first began jamming with brother Robert Herz in their rehearsal room in Griesheim and recorded their first demo on Berlin-based independent record label Nasoni Records.  While the band was officially a trio at this time, Nicolai Hildebrandt played some synthesizer parts on this first self-titled LP. Shortly thereafter, Nicolai Hildebrandt officially joined the band. Zaphire Oktalogue thus was renamed to "Okta Logue" now being a quartet.  In winter, 2009, the band began writing their first official album Ballads of a Burden, which was again released on Nasoni Records. When in 2011, the band got signed to their current label Columbia / Sony Music, Ballads of a Burden was re-released on a larger scale. Their second and current album Tales of Transit City was released on  Columbia / Sony Music on May 25, 2013 which was very well received among critics  and brought further international attention to the band which led to an international video premiere of “Transit“ on Noisey.

Since their foundation, Okta Logue has played numerous concerts all over Europe and were invited to play support for well-known acts such as Portugal. The Man and Neil Young & Crazy Horse on their European dates in 2013. On October 1, their current album  Tales of Transit City was released on New York based label The End Records for the US market. Alongside of the release in the US, the band scheduled their first US tour in October including appearances at CMJ in New York and the Culture Collide Festival in Los Angeles.

On February 11, 2016 it was announced via their Facebook Page that Nicolai Hildebrandt left the band to follow a new path. In the same post, they welcome Max Schneider as a new member of the band.

With the new formation Benno Herz, Philip Meloi, Robert Herz and Max Schneider toured a lot before they took some time off in 2018 to work on their fourth studio album. It is going to be released on May 31 via the Hamburg-based label Clouds Hill and is called "Runway Markings". Along the release the band will go on a small release tour through Germany and Austria.

Videos and awards
Apart from their musical output, Okta Logue has been especially recognised for their visual performances as well. The music video for the first single release from the album Ballads Of A Burden has received several awards, among them the prestigious first prize at the Visionale Filmfestival.  For their thriller movie-like video  "Transit" which was premiered internationally on Noisey, they collaborated with German film director Christoph Holsten. Other music videos, including "Judith" and "Let Go" (which was premiered on Spin.com) were again made by the band itself with keyboardist Nicolai Hildebrandt credited as screenwriter and director.

Discography

References

External links

 Official website
 Sony Music - Okta Logue
 Oliver Frank Management
 Booking Agency USA
 Booking Agency Germany/EU
 Booking Agency France

German rock music groups